The Ministry of National Security (MNS, Azerbaijani: Milli Təhlukəsizlik Nazirliyi) was an intelligence agency within the cabinet of Azerbaijan. The MNS was a central executive authority that carried out the competencies designated to it by the legislation of the Republic of Azerbaijan in the field of obtaining and analyzing information about foreign affairs, corporations, individuals. The MNS also carried out intelligence, counter-intelligence, protection of state secrets, revealing, preventing, precluding and detection of crimes. On 14 December 2015, President Ilham Aliyev signed a decree dissolving the ministry and creating a National Security Service with domestic duties and a foreign intelligence service.

History
Ministry of National Security of Azerbaijan was established on the material-technical and personnel basis of the Soviet Committee of State Security (KGB) on November 1, 1991. Within a short period of time, representatives of other nationalities had left the Ministry and Azerbaijan, the process of staffing Ministry only by the national specialists had begun. Not only the name and the personnel of the security body had changed, but primary change the Ministry faced was its mission and duties.

Organization 

The Ministry was guided by the Constitution of the Republic of Azerbaijan, the laws of the Republic of Azerbaijan, the decrees of President, the decisions and decrees of the Cabinet of Ministers, the international treaties of which Azerbaijan was a part, its statute, and other normative-legal acts of the MNS.

The MNS headquarters were in the following cities:
Baku
Ganja
Nakhchivan

MNS operations
In 2008, the MNS arrested a dozen of Al-Qaeda members who were involved in terrorist attack on Abu Bakr Mosque.

Foreign ties and cooperation
The MNS has ties to several foreign intelligence agencies including National Intelligence Organization, Mossad and others. The MNS helped thwart the 2000 assassination attempt on Russian president Vladimir Putin by Iraqi citizen Kenan Ahmed Rustam in Martyrs' Lane.

Ministers (1991–2015)

Ministers of National Security of Azerbaijan

See also
Politics of Azerbaijan
Terrorism in Azerbaijan

References

External links
Official site of Ministry of National Security
Regulations Extract

Counterintelligence agencies
Defunct Azeri intelligence agencies
1991 establishments in Azerbaijan
2015 disestablishments in Azerbaijan